Transgression is the sixth studio album by American heavy metal band Fear Factory. It was released on August 22, 2005 through Calvin Records. Guest appearances include Billy Gould, the bassist of Faith No More, and Lamb of God guitarist Mark Morton, who co-wrote the song "New Promise". The album was released as an enhanced CD with access to the exclusive Fear Factory website. It was also released as an enhanced DualDisc with the DVD side featuring the whole album in (48,000 kHz), music videos and "The Making of Transgression" video. One could also retrieve another bonus track, entitled "My Grave", by putting the CD into the computer and clicking the 'Music' section at the special website.

Transgression is the last album to feature original drummer Raymond Herrera and bassist/guitarist Christian Olde Wolbers who both parted ways with the band in April 2009 after original guitarist Dino Cazares returned to the band. Transgression was the first CD Fear Factory recorded since Soul of a New Machine without Rhys Fulber's input. "Moment of Impact" had a music video which found moderate airplay. The song "Transgression" was used in a scene from the 2007 thriller film Mr. Brooks. This is the first Fear Factory album to include guitar solos, with the songs "Echo of my Scream" and "New Promise" featuring one each.

Reception

The album was met with mixed to negative reviews from both critics and fans. Many have cited the downpoint of the album being the poor production and in contrast to the band's previous albums. Additionally, while other albums had a more clean and industrial styled sound, Transgression has a more raw and less polished production style with most of the industrial elements being less prominent in the albums mix or removed completely. Guitarist Christian Olde Wolbers has stated that it was hard to have a producer do everything, where usually they are more involved with the people that they work with. Because of this the album has a different mix, a different sound to it than the previous ones. He described this album as "half way finished" and also said that he had to walk out of the studio because he wasn't happy with his guitar sound.

Wolbers stated that the band was disappointed with the album due to its hurried finish due to demands from the band's label. This also accounts for the cover songs. Had the band had more time to finish the record, more tracks would have been included, and the album overall would have sounded better. 18 songs were recorded during the Transgression sessions, with five that have yet to be released. Two of them are "Ammunition" and a cover of Godflesh's "Anthem".

In 2013, Christian Olde Wolbers via his Facebook page revealed more details regarding writing\recording Transgression and Archetype:

In 2016, Metal Hammer named Transgression as Fear Factory's worst album.

Track listing

Song meanings

The title "540,000° Fahrenheit" refers to the heat in the middle of a Thermonuclear weapon explosion. The lyrics go into detail about the destruction wrought upon the body brought about by such an explosion, with the chorus lamenting the potential loss of life that may be caused by one of these devices if it was ever to be used. The title is actually a conversion of 300 000 °C.

Credits

Fear Factory
Burton C. Bell – vocals ("Vox Martyr Automata"), effects ("Comprehensive Supervision"); engineering
Christian Olde Wolbers – guitars ("Visceral Pentatonic Resonance"), bass ("Intrinsic Low End Converge"); arrangements ("Hypermutation of Musical Arrangements")
Raymond Herrera – drums ("Systematic Battery"); arrangements ("Hypermutation of Musical Arrangements"), engineering
Byron Stroud – bass* (*credited as a band member but does not perform on the album)

Additional personnel
Reggie Boyd – production assistant
Tom Jermann – visual design
Toby Wright – producer, engineer, mixing
Stephen Marcussen – mastering
James Musshorn – assistant engineer
Matt Prine – editing, visual direction
Shaun Thingvold – engineer
Chad Michael Ward – still pictures
Ben Templesmith – cover artwork
Steve Tushar – engineer, design, effects ("Design Strategies For Spectral Ambience")
Paul Lawler – sound designer ("Additional Textured Compensation") (4 & 6)
Billy Gould – bass (Special Bass Enhancement) (6 & 7)
Russell Ali – additional guitar (7)

Charts

References

Fear Factory albums
2005 albums
Albums produced by Toby Wright